is a retired Japanese kickboxer who competed in K-1 at middleweight (-70 kg). He is the former Japanese national champion of kickboxing sanctioned by All Japan Kickboxing Federation at welterweight.

Biography

Amateur era
Yuya Yamamoto was born in Takasu, Onomichi in Hiroshima, Japan on July 15, 1984. He started learning karate at Kushukaikan during his high school life. Although he was only 16 years old, he won the All Japan Shin Karate championships at lightweight. After winning the championship, he moved to Tokyo and joined Booch Beat, a kickboxing team, to be a kickboxer. On September 7, 2001, he debuted as a professional kickboxer for All Japan Kickboxing Federation(AJKF). At this time, he was only 17 years old.

Professional kickboxing
In 2004, Yamamoto challenged Yamauchi's welterweight championship on January 4, but he was defeated by the unanimous decision at 5R. On November 19, he challenged Yamauchi's title again, but he failed to win the title because the match resulted as a draw.　In January 2006, he moved to Seishunjuku from Booch Beat.

On February 6, 2005, he fought against Yoshihiro Sato. He was beaten completely as he was knocked down 6 times during the bout of 5R. Sato knocked down Yamamoto twice at 1R, twice at 2R, once at 3R, once at 4R. Yamamoto was going to be retired before fighting against Sato. For this reason, although he was offered only 10 days before, he accepted this bout as a replacement. Although he intended to retire, this bout was evaluated by K-1; thereafter, he decided to continue his career.

In 2007, he participated the tournament for the vacant welterweight championship of AJKF. He won the tournament on May 11, 2007, and 23rd champion of AJKF at welterweight. On December 28, 2007, AJKF announced that Yamamoto is going to be awarded "2007 Outstanding Performance Award" as he won the title and he beat Keiji Ozaki in October. He was awarded on January 12 in 2008.

On December 5, 2008, he fought against Christophe Pruvost from Switzerland for his AJKF Welterweight title, but he was beaten by TKO by cut and he lost his title.

Yamamoto lost to Xu Yan by TKO at Krush.16 in Tokyo, Japan on February 17, 2012.

Yamamoto competed in the Krush Grand Prix 2013 ~67kg First Class Tournament~ on January 14, 2012 in Tokyo. In the quarter-finals, he went up against Hitoshi Tsukagoshi, a quick former 63 kg fighter. Yamamoto's power was too much for Tsukagoshi, however, and he knocked him out with a brutal left hook in round three. He then lost a split decision after taking Abdellah Ezbiri into an extension round in the semis. He lost to TaCa via unanimous decision after an extension round at Krush.28 in Tokyo, Japan on May 12, 2013.

He snapped the losing skid with a split decision win over Onder Ural at Krush 31. This victory was followed up by a three fight losing streak, during which he lost by decision to Makihira Keita, Kerrith Bhella and by knockout to Kotetsu.

Titles and accomplishments

Amateur
2001 All Japan Shin Karate Championship K-2 Tournament Lightweight winner

Professional
K-1
2009 K-1 World MAX Japan Tournament Runner Up
2011 K-1 World MAX Japan Tournament Runner Up
All Japan Kickboxing Federation
 AJKF Welterweight champion

Awards
2007 AJKF Outstanding Performance Award

Kickboxing record

|-  style="background:#fbb;"
| 2015-02-06 ||  Loss  ||align=left| Kotetsu || Krush.51 || Tokyo, Japan || KO (Left Jab) || 1 || 0:41
|-  style="background:#fbb;"
| 2014-11-03 || Loss || align=left| Kerrith Bhella || K-1 World GP 2014 -65kg Championship Tournament || Shibuya, Tokyo, Japan || Decision (majority)|| 3 || 3:00
|-
|-  style="background:#fbb;"
| 2014-04-15 ||  Loss  ||align=left| Makihira Keita || Krush.40 || Tokyo, Japan || Ext.R Decision (unanimous) || 4 || 3:00
|-
|-  style="background:#cfc;"
| 2013-08-25 || win ||align=left| Onder Ural || Krush.31 || Hiroshima, Japan || Decision (Split) || 3 || 3:00
|-
|-  style="background:#fbb;"
| 2013-05-12 || Loss ||align=left| TaCa || Krush.28 || Tokyo, Japan || Ext.R Decision (unanimous) || 4 || 3:00
|-  style="background:#fbb;"
| 2013-01-14 || Loss ||align=left| Abdellah Ezbiri || Krush Grand Prix 2013 ~67 kg Tournament~, Semi Finals || Tokyo, Japan || Ext.R Decision (split) || 4 || 3:00
|-  style="background:#cfc;"
| 2013-01-14 || Win ||align=left| Hitoshi Tsukakoshi || Krush Grand Prix 2013 ~67 kg Tournament~, Quarter Finals || Tokyo, Japan || KO (left hook) || 3 || 1:59
|-  style="background:#fbb;"
| 2012-07-21 || Loss||align=left| Asami Zaurus || Krush.20 || Tokyo, Japan || Decision (Unanimous) || 3|| 3:00
|-  style="background:#fbb;"
| 2012-02-17 || Loss ||align=left| Xu Yan || Krush.16 || Tokyo, Japan || TKO (referee stoppage) || 2 || 1:39
|-  style="background:#fbb;"
| 2011-09-25 || Loss ||align=left| Yūji Nashiro || K-1 World MAX 2011 –70 kg Japan Tournament Final || Osaka, Japan || KO (punches) || 1 || 3:00
|-
! style=background:white colspan=9 |
|-  style="background:#cfc;"
| 2011-09-25 || Win ||align=left| Kenta || K-1 World MAX 2011 –70 kg Japan Tournament Semi Final || Osaka, Japan || Ext.R Decision (Unanimous) || 4 || 3:00
|-  style="background:#cfc;"
| 2011-09-25 || Win ||align=left| Shintaro Matsukura || K-1 World MAX 2011 –70 kg Japan Tournament Quarter Final || Osaka, Japan || Decision (Unanimous) || 3 || 3:00
|-
|-  style="background:#fbb;"
| 2011-05-29 || Loss ||align=left| Shintaro Matsukura ||Krush -70 kg The First Championship Tournament 1st Round  || Tokyo, Japan || Decision (Unanimous) || 3 || 3:00 
|-
! style=background:white colspan=9 |
|-  style="background:#cfc;"
| 2011-04-30 || Win ||align=left| Akihiro Gono || Krush The First Championship Tournament ~Triple Final Round~ || Tokyo, Japan || Decision (Unanimous) || 3 || 3:00
|-  style="background:#cfc;"
| 2011-01-09 || Win ||align=left| Masakazu Watanabe || Krush First Generation Kings Tournament Round 2, Super Fight || Tokyo, Japan || KO (Punches) || 2 || 2:16
|-  style="background:#cfc;"
| 2010-11-08 || Win ||align=left| Seiichi Ikemoto || K-1 World MAX 2010 -70kg World Championship Tournament Final || Tokyo, Japan || KO (Punches) || 2 || 2:22
|-  style="background:#fbb;"
| 2010-07-05 || Loss ||align=left| Yoshihiro Sato || K-1 World MAX 2010 Final 16 - Part 1 || Tokyo, Japan || Decision (Majority) || 3 || 3:00 
|-
! style=background:white colspan=9 |
|-  style="background:#cfc;"
| 2010-04-29 || Win ||align=left| Scott Shaffer || Krush 6 || Tokyo, Japan || KO (High kick) || 3 || 1:59
|-  style="background:#fbb;"
| 2010-03-27 || Loss ||align=left| Hinata Watanabe || K-1 World MAX 2010 –70 kg Japan Tournament || Saitama, Japan || Decision (Unanimous) || 3 || 3:00
|-  style="background:#fbb;"
| 2009-10-26 || Loss ||align=left| Giorgio Petrosyan || K-1 World MAX 2009 Final || Yokohama, Japan || KO (Right hook) || 1 || 2:09
|-  style="background:#cfc;"
| 2009-07-13 || Win ||align=left| Gago Drago || K-1 World MAX 2009 Final 8 || Tokyo, Japan || Decision (Unanimous) || 3 || 3:00
|-  style="background:#cfc;"
| 2009-04-21 || Win ||align=left| Chi Bin Lim || K-1 World MAX 2009 Final 16 || Fukuoka, Japan || Decision (Unanimous) || 3 || 3:00
|-  style="background:#fbb;"
| 2009-02-23 || Loss ||align=left| Taishin Kohiruimaki || K-1 World MAX 2009 Japan Tournament || Tokyo, Japan || Decision (Unanimous) || 3 || 3:00
|-
! style=background:white colspan=9 |
|-  style="background:#cfc;"
| 2009-02-23 || Win ||align=left| Yuichiro Nagashima || K-1 World MAX 2009 Japan Tournament || Tokyo, Japan || TKO (Doctor stoppage/cut) || 3 || 0:59
|-  style="background:#cfc;"
| 2009-02-23 || Win ||align=left| Tatsuji || K-1 World MAX 2009 Japan Tournament || Tokyo, Japan || Ext. R Decision (Unanimous) || 4 || 3:00
|-  style="background:#fbb;"
| 2008-12-05 || Loss ||align=left| Christophe Pruvost || All Japan Kickboxing Federation || Tokyo, Japan || TKO (Doctor stop./cut) || 4 || 2:59
|-
! style=background:white colspan=9 |
|-  style="background:#cfc;"
| 2008-11-08 || Win ||align=left| Kwon Min Seok || AJKF "Krush! 〜Kickboxing Destruction〜" || Tokyo, Japan || Decision (Unanimous) || 3 || 3:00
|-  style="background:#fbb;"
| 2008-09-19 || Loss ||align=left| Samranchai 96Penang || AJKF "SWORD FIGHT 2008 〜Japan VS Thailand 5vs5 Match〜"|| Tokyo, Japan || TKO (Doctor Stoppage) || 3 || 2:25
|-  style="background:#fbb;"
| 2008-06-22 || Loss ||align=left| Samkor Kiatmontep || AJKF Norainu Dengekisakusen|| Tokyo, Japan || Decision (Split) || 5 || 3:00
|-  style="background:#cfc;"
| 2008-04-09 || Win ||align=left| Marfio Canoletti || K-1 World MAX 2008 Final 16 || Hiroshima, Japan || Decision (Unanimous) || 3 || 3:00
|-  style="background:#fbb;"
| 2008-02-02 || Loss ||align=left| Andy Ologun || K-1 World MAX 2008 Japan Tournament || Tokyo, Japan || Decision (Unanimous)|| 3 || 3:00
|-  style="background:#cfc;"
| 2007-10-25 || Win ||align=left| Ryuji Horio || AJKF Kick Return/Kickboxer of the best 60 kg Tournament Final || Tokyo, Japan || Decision (Majority) || 3 || 3:00
|-  style="background:#cfc;"
| 2007-07-29 || Win ||align=left| Jimmy Emmers || AJKF "Super Fight 2007" || Tokyo, Japan || Decision (Unanimous) || 5 || 3:00
|-  style="background:#cfc;"
| 2007-05-11 || Win ||align=left| Mitsumasa Horikawa || AJKF "REARM" AJKF Welterweight tournament, Final || Bunkyo, Tokyo, Japan || Decision (Majority) || 5 || 3:00
|-
! style=background:white colspan=9 |
|-  style="background:#cfc;"
| 2007-03-09 || Win ||align=left| Kin Tokou || AJKF Departure 〜Norainu FINAL〜 Welterweight Championship Tournament, Semi Final  || Tokyo, Japan || TKO (Doctor Stoppage) || 2 || 1:23
|-  style="background:#fbb;"
| 2006-12-08 || Loss||align=left| Kazki Hamasaki || AJKF "Fujihara Matsuri 2006" || Tokyo, Japan || Ext.R Decision (Unanimous) || 4 || 3:00
|-  style="background:#cfc;"
| 2006-10-08 || Win ||align=left| Takayuki Weerasakreck || AJKF "Seishun Matsuri 〜Naokick's〜" || Tokyo, Japan || TKO (Doctor Stoppage) || 2 || 1:23
|-  style="background:#fbb;"
| 2006-09-04 || Loss ||align=left| Farid Khider || K-1 World MAX 2006 Champions Challenge || Yokohama, Japan || Decision (Majority)|| 3 || 3:00
|-  style="background:#fbb;"
| 2006-02-04 || Loss ||align=left| Tatsuji || K-1 World MAX 2006 Japan Tournament || Saitama, Japan || TKO (Injury, dislocated shoulder)|| 2 || 2:47
|-  style="background:#fbb;"
| 2005-11-19 || Loss ||align=left| Yassine Benhadj || Janus Fight Night 2005, Quarter Finals || Italy|| Decision  || 3 || 3:00
|-  style="background:#cfc;"
| 2005-10-12 || Win ||align=left| Ash-Ra || K-1 World MAX 2005 Champions Challenge || Tokyo, Japan || Decision (Unanimous) || 3 || 3:00
|-  style="background:#cfc;"
| 2005-09-16 || Win ||align=left| Hiroyuki Abe || AJKF "STACK OF ARMS" || Tokyo, Japan || KO (Knee) || 2 || 2:16
|-  style="background:#fbb;"
| 2005-06-14 || Loss ||align=left| Kazuki Hamasaki || K-1 World Grand Prix 2005 in Hiroshima || Hiroshima, Japan || TKO || 2 || 2:20
|-  style="background:#cfc;"
| 2005-05-04 || Win ||align=left| Yasuhiro Kido || K-1 World MAX 2005 World Tournament Open || Tokyo, Japan || Decision (Unanimous) || 3 || 3:00
|-  style="background:#cfc;"
| 2005-04-17 || Win ||align=left| Mirko Kuhn || AJKF "NEVER GIVE UP" || Tokyo, Japan || KO (3 Knockdowns) || 3 || 1:25
|-  style="background:#fbb;"
| 2005-02-06 || Loss ||align=left| Yoshihiro Sato || All Japan Kickboxing 2005: Moving || Japan || Decision (Unanimous) || 5 || 3:00
|-  style="background:#c5d2ea;"
| 2004-11-19 || Draw||align=left| Yutaro Yamauchi || AJKF "The Championship" || Tokyo, Japan ||Decision (Unanimous)|| 5 || 3:00
|-
! style=background:white colspan=9 |
|-  style="background:#cfc;"
| 2004-09-23 || Win ||align=left| Hiroyuki Takaya || All Japan Kickboxing 2004: Danger Zone || Tokyo, Japan || Decision (Unanimous) || 3 || 3:00
|-  style="background:#cfc;"
| 2004-07-24 || Win ||align=left| Mikel Sanchi || AJKF "SUPER FIGHT 〜MAXIMAM〜" || Tokyo, Japan ||Decision (Unanimous)|| 5 || 3:00
|-  style="background:#cfc;"
| 2004-05-16 || Win ||align=left| Javier || AJKF "Fire Wire" || Tokyo, Japan ||KO (Right Hook)|| 3 || 0:53
|-  style="background:#cfc;"
| 2004-04-16 || Win ||align=left| Hisayuki Kanazawa || AJKF All Japan Lightweight Tournament 2004 2nd.STAGE || Tokyo, Japan ||Decision (Majority)|| 3 || 3:00
|-  style="background:#fbb;"
| 2004-01-04 || Loss ||align=left| Yutaro Yamauchi || All Japan Kickboxing 2004: Wilderness || Tokyo, Japan || Decision (Majority) || 5 || 3:00
|-
! style=background:white colspan=9 |
|-  style="background:#cfc;"
| 2003-11-23 || Win ||align=left| Masaaki Kato || All Japan Kickboxing 2003: Scramble || Tokyo, Japan ||KO (Strikes)|| 1 || 0:58
|-  style="background:#cfc;"
| 2003-09-27 || Win ||align=left| Tomohiro Chiba || AJKF "KNOCK DOWN" || Tokyo, Japan ||KO (3 Knockdows) || 3 || 2:46
|-  style="background:#cfc;"
| 2003-07-20 || Win ||align=left| Takaya Komatsu || AJKF "KICK OUT" || Tokyo, Japan ||Decision (Unanimous) || 3 || 3:00
|-  style="background:#fbb;"
| 2003-05-23 || Loss ||align=left| Takahito Fujimaki || AJKF  || Tokyo, Japan ||Decision (Split) || 3 || 3:00
|- style="background:#fbb;"
| 2003-03-08 || Loss ||align=left| Tsogto Amara || All Japan Lightweight Strongest Decision Tournament || Tokyo, Japan || Ext. R Decision (Unanimous) || 5 || 3:00
|-  style="background:#fbb;"
| 2002-12-01 || Loss ||align=left| Lim Chi-bin || 龍PROMOTION I.K.M.F. Korea - Japan 4VS4 Match|| South Korea ||Decision || 5 || 3:00
|-  style="background:#cfc;"
| 2002-09|| Win ||align=left|  ||  || Thailand ||KO  ||  ||
|-  style="background:#cfc;"
| 2002-05-30 || Win ||align=left| Yuji Kitano || AJKF "VANGUARD" || Tokyo, Japan ||Decision (Majority) || 3 || 3:00
|-  style="background:#cfc;"
| 2002-02-15 || Win ||align=left| Makoto Hasegawa || AJKF  || Tokyo, Japan ||Decision (Unanimous) || 3 || 3:00
|-  style="background:#fbb;"
| 2001-10-12 || Loss ||align=left| Takahito Fujimaki || AJKF Lightning All Japan Lightweight Tournament Semi Finals || Tokyo, Japan ||Decision (Majority) || 3 || 3:00
|-  style="background:#cfc;"
| 2001-09-07 || Win ||align=left| Taku Harada || AJKF Lightning All Japan Lightweight Tournament Quarter Finals || Tokyo, Japan ||Decision (Unanimous) || 3 || 3:00
|-
| colspan=9 | Legend:

See also 
List of K-1 events
List of male kickboxers

References

External links
Yuya Yamamoto Official Blog
K-1 Official Profile

1984 births
Living people
Japanese male kickboxers
Welterweight kickboxers
Japanese male karateka
Sportspeople from Hiroshima Prefecture
People from Onomichi, Hiroshima